MetOp-SG (Meteorological Operational Satellite - Second Generation) is a series of six meteorological satellites developed by European Space Agency and EUMETSAT to be launched from 2025 to 2039.

Development 
In May 2014 during ILA Berlin Air Show, in a presence of chancellor Angela Merkel, ESA, EUMETSAT and Airbus Defence and Space signed the first documents for the development of second generation of the MetOp satellites.  On 16 October 2014 contract was signed with Airbus Defence and Space for a construction of the satellites, worth  in total for six spacecraft (on average  each).

In December 2014 additional contracts were signed for Ice Cloud Imagers to be used on B-series satellites and three microwave sounder instruments.

MetOp-SG satellites will be built in two series: A, carrying visible, infrared, and microwave imagers and sounders; and B, carrying microwave imagers and radars. The first A-series satellite will be launched in early 2025, while the first B-series satellite will be launched in late 2025.

References

External links 
 MetOp-SG - Meteorological data across the entire globe video presentation

Earth observation satellites of the European Space Agency
European Organisation for the Exploitation of Meteorological Satellites
Weather satellites
2020s in spaceflight
Proposed satellites
Satellite series